St Paul's College is a coeducational day and boarding school providing secondary schooling in  Walla Walla, New South Wales, Australia.  It is a member school of  Lutheran Education Australia, a network of 85 schools and 42 kindergarten/early childhood centres educating approximately 38,000 students Australia wide, and it forms part of the Riverina group of Lutheran schools together with Lutheran Primary School Wagga Wagga, St Paul's Lutheran Primary School  Henty, St John's Primary School Jindera and Victory Lutheran College Wodonga (Victoria).

St Paul's College provides a Christian Education. The student body is drawn from a wide range of Christian denominations and it includes families not associated with a church.

Location

St Paul's is located in a rural setting on the northern outskirts of  Walla Walla. Walla Walla is a town of approximately 600 people located 40 kilometres north of the cities of Albury-Wodonga and 100 km south of Wagga Wagga; 540 km south-west of Sydney and 350 km north of Melbourne.

History
When the Lutheran forefathers first settled Walla Walla they established their church and a day school. However, this school was short-lived and it was handed over to the  NSW Department of Public Instruction in 1885.

The desire of the local community for Christian secondary education led Pastor JTP Stolz to begin the planning that would lead ultimately to the establishment of St Paul's College. On Tuesday 10 February 1948, 28 foundation students answered the roll called by Werner Hebart, the founding Headmaster. Thirteen of these students were boarders and they resided with local families.

The College moved onto its current premises, from its temporary location in Zion church in 1950. Since that time there has been extensive development and refurbishment of buildings and facilities, together with the establishment and modification of curricula and programs.

Milestones in the history of St Paul's include
1948   Founding of St Pauls College
1950   Movement onto the present campus
1955   Enrolments pass 100
1963   Emergence of a heightened focus on Agriculture
1966   Enrolment of the first second generation student
1978   Introduction of the Equine program
1979   Commencement of an extensive building program
1985   Establishment of the Vertical care group structure
2000   Enrolment of the first third generation student
2005   Commencement of an extensive program of refurbishments
2008   60 year anniversary celebrations.

Strategic planning during 2008 set the direction for St Paul's future, in line with the vision of its founders, that St Paul's be a "Christ-centred community valuing people and learning." This plan focuses on what is central to St Paul's - developing its people and enhancing the quality of the learning that takes place.

Pastoral care
St Paul's has a vertically arranged pastoral care group system consisting of students from Years 7 to 12. This structure, which was introduced in 1985, replaced the typical structure of having a year coordinator assigned to each year group. Each student is assigned to a care group, either within  Kavel House or Leidig House and he or she remains in this caregroup for the duration of his or her schooling. This structure facilitates the development of strong relationships within the college community. Daily  devotions, either in Care Groups or within the whole school assembly, are an important aspect of the holistic development of students.

Educational 
St Paul's offers a relatively wide range of academic and  vocational subjects to meet students’ interests and aspirations. Some students take the opportunity to specialise in Equine or Agricultural Studies, which are two high-profile areas of learning at St Paul's. Nonetheless, a broad curriculum is offered for the majority of the students who do not wish to gain employment in an agricultural field or have an interest in Equine sports.

As part of their learning, all students learn about Christianity and other major religious groups. In Years 7-10, students learn about the Christian faith using curriculum materials from Lutheran Education Australia and they engage in  service learning. The NSW Board of Studies subject, The Study of Religion, is taught in Years 11 and 12.  Christian faith is neither presumed nor demanded from students.

Students’ learning in agriculture is supported by practical activities on the College's farms (totalling 92 ha) that are used for livestock, cropping and pasture production. The  White Suffolk  stud provides experiences in the production of sheep and wool; the preparation and showing of sheep; and the techniques of modern studwork. The College also runs a small commercial herd of cows, along with steers that are prepared for showing and carcase competitions.  Show teams visit local agricultural shows and the Royal shows in Melbourne and Sydney.

The focus of the Equine studies programme is on the  equestrian industry rather than the racing or breeding industries. Many students, including beginner riders, choose equine as a way of following their interests and developing a range of equestrian skills. The Equine centre includes stables, yards and paddocks, dressage and  jumping arenas, a round yard and a cross country training circuit. Boarding students agist their horses at the Equine centre and College horses are available for students who do not have their own horse. Supervised riding takes place after school and boarding students have the opportunity to compete at local shows and gymkhanas.

Boarding
Boarding is an important component of St Paul's; from the time when the College was first established to the present time when approximately 30% of the students are boarders.  At various times the boarding population has comprised over 80% of the enrolments with up to 160 full and weekly boarding students. Presently, boarding students are drawn from communities within the Greater Hume Shire, the Riverina, North Eastern Victoria and further afield from the cities of Sydney, Canberra and Melbourne.

Weekly boarding students return to their homes on weekends and College operated transport services are provided to and from  Wagga Wagga and Wodonga. Full boarding students remain on campus on weekends. An organised activity is provided each weekend and boarders  are encouraged to play tennis, netball, cricket and  football with local teams.

Facilities
There has been substantial investment in new facilities and the refurbishment of existing facilities in the last decade. New and refurbished facilities include:
Two year round sporting ovals irrigated by reclaimed water from the township of  Walla Walla.
Seven synthetic surface tennis courts, which are shared with the local community.
The Equine Centre comprising dressage and  jumping arenas, a round yard, stables, tackrooms, paddocks and a cross-country circuit.
The College farms totalling 92 hectares that replicate the agricultural industry in this part of New South Wales.
A Computing and Design Technology Centre equipped with metal and wood-working plant including CNC technology (opened 2005).
Refurbished Science laboratories.
A Chapel and auditorium, which seats 350 people.
Modern computer laboratories with  wireless connectivity across the campus.
A modern boarding house for male students (opened 2004).
New toilet block and changing rooms (construction 2008-2009).
Refurbished gymnasium.

See also 

 List of non-government schools in New South Wales
 List of Lutheran schools in Australia
 List of schools in the Riverina
 Education in Australia

References

External links
 St Paul's College Website
 Lutheran Education Australia Website

Lutheran schools in Australia
Private secondary schools in New South Wales
Boarding schools in New South Wales
Education in the Riverina
Educational institutions established in 1948
1948 establishments in Australia
High schools and secondary schools affiliated with the Lutheran Church